Ray Bidwell Collins (December 10, 1889 – July 11, 1965) was an American character actor in stock and Broadway theatre, radio, films, and television. With 900 stage roles to his credit, he became one of the most successful actors in the developing field of radio drama. A friend and associate of Orson Welles for many years, Collins went to Hollywood with the Mercury Theatre company and made his feature-film debut in Citizen Kane (1941), as Kane's ruthless political rival. Collins appeared in more than 75 films and had one of his best-remembered roles on television, as Los Angeles homicide detective Lieutenant Arthur Tragg in the CBS-TV series Perry Mason.

Life and career 

Ray Bidwell Collins was born December 10, 1889, in Sacramento, California, to Lillie Bidwell and William Calderwood Collins. His father was a newspaper reporter and dramatic editor on The Sacramento Bee. His mother was the niece of John Bidwell, pioneer, statesman, and founder of society in the Sacramento Valley area of California in the 19th century. Collins was inspired as a young boy to become an actor after seeing a stage performance by his uncle, Ulric Collins, who had performed the role of Dave Bartlett in the Broadway production of Way Down East. He began putting on plays with neighborhood children in Sacramento.
Collins made his professional stage debut at age 13, at the Liberty Playhouse in Oakland, California.

In December 1912, Collins and his first wife, Margaret Marriott, were a vaudeville team, who performed at the Alhambra Theatre in Seattle. In July 1914, the couple and their young son, Junius, moved to Vancouver, British Columbia, where Collins worked as an actor. In 1922, he was part of a stock company, Vancouver's Popular Players, which enacted plays at the original Orpheum Theatre. He operated his own stock company for five years at his own theatre, the Empress Theatre, in Vancouver. Collins toured in vaudeville and made his way to New York.

Collins worked prodigiously in his youth. Between the ages of 17 and 30, he was, it is said, out of work as an actor for a total of five weeks. In 1924, he and Marriott were divorced. That same year, he opened in Conscience, and after that, he was almost continually featured in Broadway plays and other theatrical productions until the Great Depression began. In 1926, he married Joan Uron.  At the start of the Great Depression, Collins turned his attention to radio, where he was involved in 18 broadcasts a week, sometimes working as many as 16 hours a day. He also played parts in short films, starting in 1930, including the Vitaphone Varieties series based on Booth Tarkington's Penrod stories.

In 1934, Collins began a long association with Orson Welles, which led to some of his most memorable roles. They met when Welles joined the repertory cast of The American School of the Air, his first job in radio. In 1935, Welles won a place in the prestigious company that presented the news dramatization series The March of Time—an elite corps of actors, including Collins, Agnes Moorehead, Everett Sloane, and Paul Stewart, who would soon form the core of Welles's Mercury Theatre.

On radio, Collins was in the distinguished repertory cast of the weekly historical drama Cavalcade of America for six years. Collins and Welles worked together on that series and others, including Welles's serial adaptation of Les Misérables (1937) and The Shadow (1937–1938).

Collins became a member of the repertory company of Welles's CBS Radio series The Mercury Theatre on the Air (1938) and its sponsored continuation, The Campbell Playhouse (1938–1940). Through the run of the series, Collins played many roles in literary adaptations, including Squire Livesey in "Treasure Island", Dr. Watson in "Sherlock Holmes", and Mr. Pickwick in "The Pickwick Papers". Collins's best-known (albeit uncredited) work on this series, however, was in "The War of the Worlds", the celebrated broadcast in which he played three roles, most notably the rooftop newscaster who describes the destruction of New York.

Along with other Mercury Theatre players, Collins made his feature-film debut in Citizen Kane (1941), in which he portrayed ruthless political boss Jim W. Gettys. He appeared in Welles's original Broadway production of Native Son (1941) and played a principal role in Welles's second film, The Magnificent Ambersons (1942). His ongoing radio work included Welles's wartime series, Ceiling Unlimited and Hello Americans (1942), and the variety show The Orson Welles Almanac (1944).

Having returned to his native California, Collins appeared in more than 75 major motion pictures, including Leave Her to Heaven (1945); The Best Years of Our Lives (1946); Crack-Up (1946); A Double Life (1947); two entries in the Ma and Pa Kettle series; and the 1953 version of The Desert Song, in which he played the nonsinging role of Kathryn Grayson's father. He displayed comic ability in The Bachelor and the Bobby-Soxer (1947) and The Man from Colorado (1948), and played a supporting role in Welles's Touch of Evil (1958).

On television, Collins was a regular in The Halls of Ivy (1954–1955), starring Ronald Colman. He appeared as Judge Harper in a 1955 TV adaptation of the holiday classic Miracle on 34th Street, starring Thomas Mitchell, Teresa Wright, and MacDonald Carey. In 1957, Collins joined the cast of the CBS-TV series Perry Mason and gained fame as Los Angeles police homicide detective Lieutenant Arthur Tragg.

By 1960, Collins found his physical health declining and his memory waning, problems that in the next few years brought an end to his career. About the difficulty in remembering his lines, he said "Years ago, when I was on the Broadway stage, I could memorize 80 pages in eight hours. I had a photographic memory. When I got out on the stage, I could actually — in my mind — see the lines written on top of the page, the middle, or the bottom. But then radio came along, and we read most of our lines, and I got out of the habit of memorizing. I lost my natural gift. Today it's hard for me. My wife works as hard as I do, cueing me at home."

In October 1963, Collins filmed his last Perry Mason episode, "The Case of the Capering Camera", broadcast January 16, 1964. Although clearly Collins would not return to work on the series, his name appeared in the opening title sequence through the eighth season, which ended in May 1965. Executive producer Gail Patrick Jackson was aware that Collins watched the show every week and wished not to discourage him.

On July 11, 1965, Collins died of emphysema at St. John's Hospital in Santa Monica, California, at age 75. Masonic funeral services were held at Forest Lawn Memorial Park, Hollywood Hills.

Private life

Collins supported Thomas Dewey in the 1944 United States presidential election.

Theatre credits 
Ray Collins played 900 roles on the legitimate stage.

Radio credits

Film and television credits

References

External links 

 
 
 
 

1889 births
1965 deaths
American male film actors
American male stage actors
American male radio actors
American male television actors
Male actors from Sacramento, California
Deaths from emphysema
Burials at Forest Lawn Memorial Park (Hollywood Hills)
20th-century American male actors
Federal Theatre Project people